John Rede (c. 1530 – 3 August 1570) was the member of Parliament for Cricklade in the parliament of November 1554.

References 

Members of Parliament for Cricklade
English MPs 1554–1555
1530s births
1570 deaths
People from the Borough of Tewkesbury
Commissioners for sewers
English barristers